This is a list of States and Union Territories of India by speakers of Gujarati as of census 2001. Gross population figures are  available online.

See also
States of India by urban population
States of India by size of economy

Gujarati language
G